The 2017–18 Hong Kong FA Cup was the 43rd edition of the Hong Kong FA Cup. 10 teams entered this edition, with two games played in Round 1 before the Quarter Final stage. The competition was only open to club that participated in the 2017–18 Hong Kong Premier League, with lower division sides entering a separate competition.

The champion received HK$100,000 in prize money and the runners up received HK$40,000. The MVP of the final will receive a HK$10,000 bonus.

Bracket

Bold = winner
* = after extra time, = penalty shootout score

Fixtures and results

First round

Quarter-finals

Semi-finals

Final

References

2017-18
Shield
2017–18 Asian domestic association football cups